Selçuk is a common masculine Turkish given name. 
It is the modern Turkish form of Seljuq, the name of the eponymous founder of the Seljuq dynasty. 
The name was used as a surname from the early 20th century, and became popular as a given name by the mid 20th century.

Given name
 Selçuk Alibaz (born 1989), Turkish footballer
 Selçuk Altun (born 1950), Turkish writer, publisher, and retired banking executive
 Selçuk Aydın (born 1983), Turkish boxer
 Selçuk Baştürk (born 1986), Turkish footballer
 Selçuk Dereli (born 1969), Turkish football referee
 Selçuk Eker (born 1991), Turkish amateur boxer
 Selçuk İnan (born 1985), Turkish footballer
 Selçuk Şahin (footballer born 1981), Turkish footballer who plays for Fenerbahçe
 Selçuk Şahin (footballer born 1983), Turkish footballer who plays for Orduspor
 Selçuk Uluergüven (1941–2014), Turkish actor
 Selçuk Yula (1959–2013), Turkish footballer

Surname
 Münir Nurettin Selçuk (1900–1981), Turkish classical musician and tenor singer
 İlhan Selçuk (1925–2010), Turkish lawyer, journalist, author, novelist, and editor
 Timur Selçuk (1946–2020), Turkish pop music singer, pianist, conductor, and composer
 Zehra Zümrüt Selçuk Koç (born 1979), Turkish female government minister

See also
 Seljuk
 Selçuk (disambiguation)

Turkish masculine given names
Turkish-language surnames